Tertulla is an Ancient Roman nickname for the female cognomen Tertia. Tertia in Latin means "the third daughter". Women with the name include:
 Tertulla (wife of Crassus), wife of Marcus Licinius Crassus, the richest man in Rome
 Arrecina Tertulla, once wife of the future Emperor Titus
 Julia Tertulla, wife of Roman Senator Lucius Julius Marinus Caecilius Simplex
 Atilia Caucidia Tertulla, wife of Roman Senator Appius Annius Trebonius Gallus
 Junia Tertia, often called just "Tertulla", a daughter of Julius Caesar's favorite mistress Servilia

Roman naming conventions